Jonathan Hogan (born June 13, 1951) is an American actor.

Born and raised in Chicago, Illinois, Hogan made his New York City stage debut in the off-Broadway Circle Repertory Company's highly successful production of The Hot l Baltimore. He remained with the company for Fifth of July (for which he composed the incidental music), Balm in Gilead (sharing a Drama Desk Award for Outstanding Ensemble Acting), Burn This, and As Is, all of which eventually transferred to Broadway. The last garnered him Drama Desk and Tony Award nominations as Best Actor in a Play. Additional Broadway credits include Comedians, The Caine Mutiny Court Martial, and  The Homecoming.

Hogan's television credits include stints on the soap operas  The Doctors, Ryan's Hope, As the World Turns, and One Life to Live and appearances on L.A. Law, Quantum Leap, Law & Order: Criminal Intent, Law & Order: Special Victims Unit, Law & Order: Trial by Jury, the original Law & Order, in which he has been a guest star four times, and House of Cards.

External links
 
 
 

1951 births
Living people
American male stage actors
American male television actors
Male actors from Chicago
20th-century American male actors
21st-century American male actors
American male soap opera actors